39 Steps is an album by guitarist John Abercrombie with pianist Marc Copland, bassist Drew Gress, and drummer Joey Baron that was recorded in 2013 and released by ECM.

Reception

The AllMusic review by  Thom Jurek states, "Abercrombie's 39 Steps offers the sound of a veteran quartet playing at the height of its individual members' intuitive and collective abilities".

On All About Jazz Andrew Luhn said:

Also on All About Jazz, John Kelman noted:

Track listing

Personnel
 John Abercrombie – guitar
 Marc Copland – piano
 Drew Gress – double bass
 Joey Baron – drums

References

ECM Records albums
John Abercrombie (guitarist) albums
2013 albums
Albums produced by Manfred Eicher